Abdenour Hadiouche (born December 30, 1984, in Bouïra) is an Algerian football player who plays for JS Kabylie in the Algerian Ligue Professionnelle 1.

Club career
On July 2, 2007, Hadiouche signed a two-year contract with NA Hussein Dey. The previous season, he finished as the top scorer of the Regionale II (Division 5) with OC Azazga after scoring 26 goals.

References

External links
 
 

1984 births
Living people
People from Bouïra
Algerian footballers
Algerian Ligue Professionnelle 1 players
NA Hussein Dey players
MC El Eulma players
MC Saïda players
JS Kabylie players
Association football forwards
21st-century Algerian people